Éva Rakusz (born 13 May 1961, in Miskolc) is a Hungarian sprint canoer who competed in the 1980s. Competing in two Summer Olympics, she won two medals with a silver (K-4 500 m: 1988) and a bronze (K-2 500 m: 1980).

Rakusz also won seven medals at the ICF Canoe Sprint World Championships with a gold (K-4 500 m: 1986), three silvers (K-1 500 m: 1981, K-2 500 m: 1985, K-4 500 m: 1987), and three bronzes (K-1 500 m: 1982, K-4 500 m: 1982, 1985).
Nowadays she works as a P.E. teacher at Eötvös József Gimnázium,Tiszaújváros.

She was named Hungarian Sportswoman of The Year in 1981 after having won a silver medal at the World championships the same year.

References

External links
 

1961 births
Canoeists at the 1980 Summer Olympics
Canoeists at the 1988 Summer Olympics
Hungarian female canoeists
Living people
Olympic canoeists of Hungary
Olympic silver medalists for Hungary
Olympic bronze medalists for Hungary
Olympic medalists in canoeing
ICF Canoe Sprint World Championships medalists in kayak

Medalists at the 1988 Summer Olympics
Medalists at the 1980 Summer Olympics
Sportspeople from Miskolc